Brunei Shell Recreation Club Football Club (abbrev: BSRC FC), formerly Brunei Shell FC, is a football team from Brunei. The team represents the football department of Brunei Shell Recreational Club situated in Panaga, Belait.

History 
The team was founded in 2004 and originally known as Brunei Shell FT. Awang Hj Aji bin Hitam was in charge of this team in 2004. This team has had a number of managers over the years, and at the moment, Awang Hj Ismail bin Hj Bakar holds the position in conjunction with Head Coach Hailmey Ariffin. The team's objective is to represent the Belait District in the leagues run by Football Association of Brunei Darussalam (FABD) and develop into a hub for young people in the district to hone their football skills.

The BSRC FC are more focused on the Brunei League match later in order to improve the skill of the Kuala Belait youngsters in football games. According to BSRC FC Public Relations, Bibi Azlina stated that they are certain that BSRC will be able to perform to their highest potential and will be highly committed and enthusiastic to learn from their mistakes in prior league matches. The club started entering a football team for Brunei's domestic football competition the B-League in 2004, finishing 10th in the newly organized second level Premier Two. They managed to play in the top-flight in only two seasons, 2007/08 and 2009/10. 

The club was renamed as BSRC FT in 2011 and  finished third in the Brunei Premier League in 2018 and advanced to the Brunei FA Cup semifinals, where Kota Ranger faced stiff competition in 2019. To comply with Club Licensing rules, this team's name was once more changed in 2019 to BSRC FC, which it still uses today. When the Brunei Super League was expanded to 16 teams, BSRC FT was included as new participants. The BSRC FC Team had been conducting field training every Monday and Tuesday night before the COVID-19 epidemic developed. The team will work out in the gym on Wednesday night, then work out privately on Thursday, and then play a friendly match on Friday. Training is only offered at this time on Mondays, Wednesdays, and Fridays.

Current squad

See also 

 List of football clubs in Brunei
 Brunei Super League

References

Association football clubs established in 2004
Football clubs in Brunei
Works association football teams